Abhijit Sarkar (born 5 January 2000) is an Indian professional footballer who plays as an attacking midfielder for Real Kashmir in the I-League. He has represented India at various youth levels, and also played for them in the 2017 FIFA U-17 World Cup.

Career
Born in Bandel, West Bengal, Sarkar was part of the AIFF Elite Academy batch that was preparing for the 2017 FIFA U-17 World Cup to be hosted in India. After the tournament, Sarkar was selected to play for the Indian Arrows, an All India Football Federation-owned team that would consist of India under-20 players to give them playing time. He made his professional debut for the side in the Arrow's first match of the season against Chennai City. He came on as a 90th-minute substitute for Jeakson Singh Thounaojam as Indian Arrows won 3–0. On 10 February 2018 Sarkar came on as a substitute and scored twice in injury time to lift the arrows to a 2–1 victory over Churchill Brothers. After an impressive season, he signed for Indian Super League club Chennaiyin FC for the 2018-19 season. He was loaned back to the Indian Arrows, and played 6 games in the 2018-19 season, scoring 1 goal. For the 2019-20 season, he was loaned to  East Bengal.

International
Sarkar represented the India under-17 side which participated in the 2017 FIFA U-17 World Cup which was hosted in India.

Career statistics

Club

References

2000 births
Living people
People from Nadia district
Indian footballers
East Bengal Club players
AIFF Elite Academy players
Indian Arrows players
Association football midfielders
Footballers from West Bengal
I-League players
India youth international footballers
Chennaiyin FC players
Indian Super League players
Sudeva Delhi FC players